Cleveland Dear Sr. (August 22, 1888 – December 30, 1950), was a two-term U.S. representative for Louisiana's 8th congressional district, since disbanded, a district attorney, a state court judge, and a candidate in 1936 for governor of Louisiana.

Background

Dear was the youngest of eleven children born to Mississippi natives James Mackburn Dear (1846–1925) and the former Sarah Jane Harper (1849–1932) in Sugartown in Beauregard Parish in western Louisiana. After early education in country schools, Dear graduated from Louisiana State University and its Paul M. Hebert Law Center, both in Baton Rouge. He was a member of Sigma Alpha Epsilon fraternity. In 1914, he received his law degree and was admitted that same year to the bar. At first, he was in partnership in Alexandria in Rapides Parish in Central Louisiana, with Frank H. Peterman in the firm Peterman & Dear.  When V. H. Peterman, the father of Frank Peterman joined the firm, it became Peterman, Dear & Peterman. The firm handled local interests of the Texas & Pacific Railway and the Louisiana Railway and Navigation Company.

On April 8, 1917, two days after the American entrance into World War I, Dear entered the United States Army officers' training camp at Fort Logan H. Roots in Arkansas, where he achieved the rank of first lieutenant in the field artillery. He was thereafter assigned to Camp Pike in Arkansas and then Fort Meade in Maryland, where he was discharged on December 14, 1918. He was then a captain in the Department of the Organized Reserve Corps. After his discharge, he was active in the newly established American Legion.

In April 1921, Dear married the former Marion Suzanne Anderson (died 1969), a native of Chicago, Illinois, who later resided in Milwaukee, Wisconsin. The couple had a daughter, Marion Dear Weber (1923-2009), and a son, Cleveland "Cleve" Dear, Jr. (1928-2015), a petroleum engineering graduate of both the Colorado School of Mines in Golden, Colorado, and LSU, who spent his later years with his wife and three children in Junction in Kimble County, Texas, where he died at the age of eighty-seven.

Dear was a Baptist deacon; his wife was Episcopalian. He was active in the Masonic lodge, the Shriners, and the Benevolent and Protective Order of Elks.

Political life

In 1920, Dear was  elected district attorney for the 9th Judicial District based in Alexandria, a position that he held until his election in 1932 to the U.S. House. In Congress, he was the chairman of the House Committee on Elections No. 1.

In 1936, Dear attempted to succeed Governor James A. Noe of Monroe, who had briefly served upon the death of Oscar K. Allen of Winnfield. He was defeated by another Democrat, the pro-Long Richard Webster Leche of New Orleans.

Dear then resumed the practice of law and was subsequently appointed judge in the Ninth Judicial District, a position which he retained with subsequent successful elections until his death. His last judicial nomination was in the Democratic primary held in August 1948.

He died in Alexandria and is interred at nearby Greenwood Memorial Park in Pineville, along with son Cleveland, Jr.

References

 
 Political Graveyard

 

1888 births
1950 deaths
Louisiana state court judges
District attorneys in Louisiana
Louisiana State University alumni
Louisiana State University Law Center alumni
Politicians from Alexandria, Louisiana
People from Beauregard Parish, Louisiana
United States Army officers
United States Army personnel of World War I
Baptists from Louisiana
Democratic Party members of the United States House of Representatives from Louisiana
20th-century American judges
Burials in Louisiana
20th-century American politicians
20th-century Baptists